Cydia chlorostola is a moth of the family Tortricidae. It was first described by Edward Meyrick in 1932. It is endemic to the Hawaiian island of Oahu.

It is known from a single female and may be extinct.

External links

Species info

Grapholitini
Endemic moths of Hawaii
Moths described in 1932